Amanda Lehotak is an American softball coach who was the head coach at Penn State.

Early life and education
Lehotak played softball for Daniel J. Gross High School in Bellevue, Nebraska. She began her college career at the University of Mississippi played for two seasons (2000–2001) then transferring to the University of Nebraska-Omaha to play for two more years (2002–2003).

Coaching career

Jacksonville
Lehotak was named head softball coach of the Jacksonville Softball Program on June 30, 2006. She was promoted from assistant coach to head coach after Melissa Gentile resigned as head coach after one season.

UTSA

Penn State
Penn State named Lehotak the seventh head softball coach of the Penn State Softball Program on July 22, 2013. She was hired after two mediocre seasons at UTSA. On July 6, 2020, Lehotak resigned as head coach of the Nittany Lions.

Head coaching record

College
References:

References

Living people
Female sports coaches
American softball coaches
Penn State Nittany Lions softball coaches
UTSA Roadrunners softball coaches
Jacksonville Dolphins softball coaches
Missouri Western Griffons softball coaches
Ole Miss Rebels softball players
Omaha Mavericks softball players
Year of birth missing (living people)